The 2014 Lamar Hunt U.S. Open Cup tournament proper features teams from all five tiers of men's soccer of the American Soccer Pyramid.

The 2014 tournament added another round to include the largest field of teams (80) in tournament history. All American-based teams from the top three tiers, Major League Soccer, the North American Soccer League, and USL Pro earned berths into the fourth, third, and second rounds of the tournament, respectively.

For the fourth and fifth tiers of the pyramid, a series of qualification and state tournaments are held to determine the berths into the tournament. These teams will complete the 80-team field in the U.S. Open Cup.

National Premier Soccer League 

In addition to the two teams from the West Region (CD Aguiluchos USA & San Diego Flash), the other regions qualifiers are Brooklyn Italians, Greater Binghamton Thunder, RVA FC, Jacksonville United, Chattanooga FC, FC Lehigh Valley United Sonic, Tulsa Athletics, Detroit City FC, New York Red Bulls U-23s

West Region - Southwest Conference Qualifying Tournament
All six teams of the 2014 Southwest Conference competed in the qualifying tournament with FC Hasental and the San Diego Flash receiving first round byes.

Matches

West Region - Golden Gate Conference Qualifying Tournament
All five teams of the 2014 Golden Gate Conference will compete in the qualifying tournament with Sonoma County Sol and Sacramento Gold starting off with a play-in game.

Matches

West Region - Northwest Conference Qualifying Tournament
All four teams of the new 2014 Northwest Conference will compete in the qualifying tournament.

Matches

West Region - Golden Gate/Northwest Playoff Game
The champions of the Golden Gate and Northwest Conference Qualifying Tournaments will play each other to determine the qualifier for the US Open Cup.

Matches

USASA 
Based on the USASA retaining their eight qualification spots, although this has yet to be confirmed by US Soccer.

The USASA adopted new qualification standards for the 2014 tournament citing earlier qualifying deadlines by USSF. They will now use the results from the previous calendar years tournaments to determine regional qualifiers. Region I has already adopted that their qualifiers will be the regional champion of both the USASA National Cup and the USASA US Amateur Cup. Some regions have adopted different methods in this transition year.

US Club Soccer 

NorCal Premier League will host a tournament that is open to any team that is a registered US soccer team. Chivas USA U23s & Corinthians USA from the SoCal Premier League have already signed up. The winner of this tournament will play a Play-In match against No. 6 seed Juventus SC Black 93.

USSSA 

Based on keeping one qualifying spot from the 2013 tournament, the winner will be the qualifier. Due to field conditions and rescheduling issues, all games except the final will be shortened 50-minute games. The final will still be the standard 90 minutes.

Group play

Championship stage

References 

Open Cup qualification IPL 2017 Prediction

External links
 U.S. Soccer Federation
 TheCup.us - Unofficial U.S. Open Cup News 

U.S. Open Cup